The Veritas Project is a Christian science fiction series of books written by Frank E. Peretti and targeted towards teenagers.

Overview
The series presents the Veritas Project as a privately funded team commissioned by the President to investigate supernatural occurrences, mysteries, and crimes from a Judeo-Christian perspective.  The team consists of Nate and Sarah Springfield and their sixteen-year-old twins Elijah and Elisha.  Their mission is to report not only the facts related to their cases, but also the truth behind the facts.  Veritas in Latin means "truth".

Books
Currently, the two entries in the series are Hangman's Curse (2001) and Nightmare Academy (2002).

The first book Hangman's Curse focuses on a high school whose students are stricken by the alleged curse of the school's ghost.  The Springfields are sent on a covert mission to uncover the truth behind the events.

In the second novel Nightmare Academy Elijah and Elisha investigate a mysterious school that appears to be connected to the disappearances of runaway teenagers.

American science fiction novels
American Christian novels
2001 American novels
2002 American novels